Sadat Mahalleh (also Romanized as Sādāt Maḩalleh) is a village in Hend Khaleh Rural District, Tulem District, Sowme'eh Sara County, Gilan Province, Iran. At the 2006 census, its population was 448, in 122 families.

References 

Populated places in Sowme'eh Sara County